

227001–227100 

|-id=065
|  227065 Romandia ||  || Romandy, the French-speaking part of Switzerland, by its Latin name "Romandia" || 
|}

227101–227200 

|-id=151
|  227151 Desargues ||  || Girard Desargues (1591–1661), French mathematician and engineer || 
|-id=152
| 227152 Zupi ||  || Giovanni Battista Zupi (1590–1650), an Italian astronomer, mathematician, and Jesuit priest, who, in 1639, was first to note Mercury's planetary phases, alike the phases of Venus and the Lunar phase. The crater Zupus on the Moon is also named after him. || 
|}

227201–227300 

|-id=218
|  227218 Rényi ||  || Alfréd Rényi (1921–1970), a Hungarian mathematician. || 
|}

227301–227400 

|-id=310
| 227310 Scottkardel ||  || W. Scott Kardel (born 1962), for his service as the Managing Director of the International Dark Sky Association and his efforts to combat light pollution and protect the nighttime environment. || 
|-id=326
|  227326 Narodychi ||  || Narodychi, a settlement located in northern Ukraine. It has been known since 1545. During the Chernobyl disaster in 1986, the urban-type settlement was seriously affected and recommended for evacuation. However, life in Narodychi goes on. || 
|}

227401–227500 

|-bgcolor=#f2f2f2
| colspan=4 align=center | 
|}

227501–227600 

|-bgcolor=#f2f2f2
| colspan=4 align=center | 
|}

227601–227700 

|-id=641
|  227641 Nothomb ||  || Amélie Nothomb (born 1967), a Belgian writer. || 
|}

227701–227800 

|-id=767
|  227767 Enkibilal ||  || Enki Bilal (born 1951), a Serbian graphic novelist and film director. Born in Belgrade, he  moved with his family to Paris in 1960, where he published his first story in Pilote magazine in 1972 and his first album in 1975. He received the Grand Prix at the 14th Angoulême festival in 1987. || 
|-id=770
|  227770 Wischnewski ||  || Erik Wischnewski (born 1952) has been a lecturer at adult education centers and planetaria since 1972 and is an author of several astronomical textbooks. His work contributes to the German-language astronomical education. || 
|}

227801–227900 

|-bgcolor=#f2f2f2
| colspan=4 align=center | 
|}

227901–228000 

|-id=930
|  227930 Athos ||  || Athos, a fictional character in the novels The Three Musketeers, Twenty Years After and The Vicomte de Bragelonne by Alexandre Dumas || 
|-id=962
|  227962 Aramis ||  || Aramis, a fictional character in Dumas' The Three Musketeers and its sequels. The character is loosely based on the historical musketeer Henri d'Aramitz. (Also see .) || 
|-id=997
| 227997 NIGLAS ||  || The Nanjing Institute of Geography & Limnology, Chinese Academy of Sciences (NIGLAS) was established in 1940. It is the only national institute devoted to lake-basin system research and has made enormous contributions to environmental remediation and regional development. || 
|}

References 

227001-228000